Dichostates corticarius is a species of beetle in the family Cerambycidae. It was described by Hintz in 1910.

References

Crossotini
Beetles described in 1910